Mark Kuhlmann (born 18 August 1969) is a retired German international rugby union player, having played for the DRC Hannover in the Rugby-Bundesliga and the German national rugby union team. He captained Germany for a lengthy period of time during his career in the national team. He is, behind Horst Kemmling, Germany's second-most capped rugby player.

Kuhlmann was, from 2008 to 2012, the coach of SC Neuenheim. Before joining Neuenheim in 2008, Kuhlmann had spent his entire coaching and playing career with the DRC Hannover, in an era when DRC took out six German championships and three national cup wins.

In March 2009, Kuhlmann stepped down as joint coach of Germany after three and a half years in office, while the other two coaches  Rudolf Finsterer and Bruno Stolorz, remained in the job.

After not having played in 2008-09, he made one appearance for SCN in the 2009-10 Bundesliga season. Kuhlmann indicated that the 2011-12 season would be his last as coach of SCN, is contract not being extended at the end of the season.

Honours

Club
 German rugby union championship
 Champions: 1998, 1999, 2000, 2001, 2002, 2005
 Runners up: 2003, 2004
 German rugby union cup
 Winner: 2002, 2003, 2006
 Runners up: 1997, 2004, 2005
 German sevens championship
 Runners up: 1999

Stats
Mark Kuhlmann's personal statistics in club and international rugby:

Club

 As of 18 May 2010

References

External links
   Mark Kuhlmann at totalrugby.de

1969 births
Living people
German rugby union coaches
German rugby union players
Germany international rugby union players
DRC Hannover players
SC Neuenheim players
Rugby union centres